Metcalfe’s Food Company was a privately owned food business set up in 2010 by Julian Metcalfe, the founder of the sandwich chain Pret A Manger and Robert Jakobi. Metcalfe’s Food Company sold products under two brands Metcalfes Skinny and itsu grocery.

The company enjoyed a compound annual growth rate of over 200% in revenues between 2011 and 2014. In February 2014 the company had forecast to achieve £50 Million in sales within the next 3 years. As of December 2014, Metcalfe's Food Company were the fastest-growing, privately owned food and drink company in the UK.

Key people

Robert Jakobi was the Co-Owner and Managing Director of Metcalfe’s Food Company. He played a key role in the evolution of the business. Previously, an investment banker, Jakobi introduced chocolate covered edamame to the UK market in 2010 and sold them initially under his own ‘Pod bites’ brand in high-end stores such as Harvey Nichols and Selfridges. Convinced they had a lively commercial future, he sought a bigger platform for the product and after meeting Julian Metcalfe agreed to merge ‘Pod bites’ into Metcalfe’s Food Company and become the Managing Director in October 2010. The chocolate covered edamame are still one of the key products in the itsu [grocery] range.

Split

In May 2015 the company announced it would split the two brands into two. itsu grocery would become a core part of the Itsu business and Metcalfes Skinny would become a standalone business.

Metcalfes skinny

In January 2016 Diamond Foods acquired a minority stake in Metcalfes Skinny. The investment helped to maximise the growth potential of the brand in the UK and Europe.

In September 2016 the new owner of Kettle Foods Snyder's-Lance, Inc. acquired the remainder of the business.

Awards

In December 2013, Metcalfe's Food Company were featured as one of ten ‘Ones to Watch’ in the Sunday Times Fast Track 100. The Fast Track 100 ranks the fastest growing privately owned companies in the UK.

In April 2014, Robert Jakobi along with Julian Metcalfe were named as London & South finalists for the 2014 Ernst & Young Entrepreneur of the Year Award. The award is considered one of the world’s most prestigious business awards and is held in more than 145 cities and in more than 60 countries worldwide.

In May 2014, Metcalfe’s Food Company were announced as one of the winners of The Santander Breakthrough 50 Awards. The awards celebrate the UK’s top 50 most exciting fast-growth companies.

In December 2014, Metcalfe’s Food Company were ranked at number 4 in the Sunday Times Fast Track 100.

References

Snack food manufacturers of the United Kingdom
Food and drink companies established in 2010
Food and drink companies disestablished in 2016
2010 establishments in England
2016 disestablishments in England